Güllerin Savaşı, was a Turkish television series, produced by Med Yapım and broadcast on Kanal D. It starred Damla Sönmez as Gülru Çelik and Canan Ergüder as Gülfem Sipahi.

Plot 

Gülru was born in one of the slums of Istanbul and then grew up in a high class neighborhood in a mansion where her father works as a gardener. From the age of 6, Gülru lives the dream of being like Gülfem. In order to live in a great mansion, Gülru learns to balance the differences of a lifestyle in which she was born and the other lifestyle that she finally lives.

From a very early age, Gülru and Mert had a sweet childhood love. Years later, when Gülfem returns home, Gülru remembers her childhood dream. When Gülru and Gülfem meet Omer, tension begins to accumulate in the mansion and in the neighborhood, confusing Gülru. At the same time that it allows you to feel loved, your dreams and reality fade away. With Gülfem at the climax of her life and Gülru living her dreams, this story will continue as a war of passions, affecting the lives of everyone else.

Cast 

 Damla Sönmez as Gülru Çelik
 Canan Ergüder as Gülfem Sipahi
 Barış Kılıç as Ömer Hekimoğlu
 Sercan Badur as Cihan Sipahi
 Yiğit Kirazcı as Mert Gencer
 Atilla Şendil as Salih Çelik
 Arif Pişkin as Şevket Hekimoğlu
 Arsen Gürzap as Cahide Hekimoğlu
 Meltem Pamirtan as Mesude Çelik Yıldırım
 Münire Apaydın as Mebrure Hekimoğlu
 Zeynep Köse as Yonca Çelik
 Turgay Tanülkü as Recep Gencer
 Berk Yaygın as Yener Yıldırım
 Aslı İçözü as Halide Demir
 Pınar Afsar as Ayla Sipahi
 Feyza Civelek as Çiçek Çelik
 Uğur Kurul as Taner Hekimoğlu
 Güzin Alkan as Naciye Gencer
 İsmail Oral as İsmail
 Çisem Çancı as Ceylan Gencer
 Ceren Koç as Mine
 Serap Aksoy as Cahide Hekimoğlu

Episodes

See also 

 Television in Turkey
 List of Turkish television series
 Turkish television drama

References

External links 

 
 
 Güllerin Savaşı BeyazPerde.com
 Güllerin Savaşı Sinematurk.com

Turkish drama television series
2014 Turkish television series debuts
2016 Turkish television series endings
Television series produced in Istanbul
Television shows set in Istanbul
Television series set in the 2010s